The Museum of Wimbledon is a local history museum at 22 Ridgway, Wimbledon, in the London Borough of Merton. The museum was established in 1916. Run by The Wimbledon Society and staffed by volunteers, it is open at the weekends but, as of November 2020, is closed for refurbishment.

The Wimbledon Society also runs the adjacent Village Hall Trust Gallery, which is used for photographic and other exhibitions, such as "Wimbledon Now and Then", which ran from December 2013 to March 2014.

References

External links
Official website
The Wimbledon Society

1916 establishments in England
Buildings and structures in Wimbledon, London
Local museums in London
Museums established in 1916
Museums in the London Borough of Merton
History museums in London